Cerisy-la-Forêt is a commune in the Manche department of Normandy in north-western France. It has a population of 1,036 inhabitants (2019) and possesses an important environmental and architectural heritage.

The area has been occupied since antiquity and is linked to the foundation of the Saint-Vigor Abbey in the early 20th century. The commune comprises several castles (Château de la Boulaye, Château de la Couespellière) and manor houses and is bordered by Cerisy forest.

Geography
Its area is 23.81 km2. The village is located 13.4 km northeast of Saint-Lô, overlooking the valley of the Elle, and offering an unobstructed panorama over the Cerisy Forest a kilometer away. The Massif Armoricain, of which Cerisy-la-Forêt occupies the extreme north, is a country of dairy farms. The landscapes are composed of meadows, hedges, wooded areas and wetlands. The nearest stations are Gare de Lison and Gare de Le Molay-Littry.

Bayeux is18km directly east, Saint-Lô, prefecture of the department, is 14 km to the south-west, and Caen is 42 km to the east.

Geology
The Armorican Massif, to the south-west, is a deposit made up of clays, schists, gravels, and granite. The altitude of the village ranges between 34 meters and 131 meters. The highest point corresponds to the place called "Vieux Graviers", a small hill located at the edge of Cerisy-la-Forêt.

The subsoil of Cerisy-la-Forêt dates from the Proterozoic geological period.

Climate
The climate is oceanic, with an annual rainfall close to 900mm. Rains are fairly frequent throughout the year but more abundant in autumn and winter due to disturbances from the Atlantic Ocean. Rarely intense, they are often drizzles.

The average temperature is 10 °C.
In winter, the average temperature oscillates between 1 °C and 7 °C. There are between 30 and 40 days of frost per year. In summer, the average temperature is around 20 °C.

Cerisy-la-Forêt does not have a weather station; the closest one is that of Caen-Carpiquet.

Name

'Cerisy-la-Forêt' is often referred to as 'Cerisy'. The name is derived from the Latin word cerasus meaning "cherry", though Auguste Vincent holds that it is named for a Gallo-Roman by the name Carisius or Charisius

History

Ancient history
Cerisy was first settled as an oppidum, the ruins of which remain outside the town. 
The Romans built a fort to guard the Roman road that ran through the valley.

Middle Ages
The earliest mention of Cerisy-la-Forêt dates back to the 6th century, when Gaul began to Christianize. Vigor, one of the first evangelists in the region, received from Volusian, the local lord, twenty-five villages, to thank him for having rid the region of a "horrible serpent that put to death men and animals". Around 510 AD he built a monastery dedicated to St. Peter and St. Paul on the site of what had been a Druid holy site.

In the 9th century, Neustria was invaded by the Vikings, who in 891 plundered Bayeux, and Vigor's monastery was destroyed. King Charles III the Simple gave Rollo the countries of the lower Seine in the Treaty of Saint-Clair-sur-Epte in 911, and then Bessin in 924.

Cerisy became an important market town under the Normans, who build Cerisy Abbey. The abbey went on to consist of forty-eight parishes and eight priories, including two in England, (Sherborne and Peterborough). Dependent on the Holy See, Cerisy maintained close relations with monasteries in Mont-Saint-Michel, Saint-Ouen, Jumièges, Le Bec-Hellouin, Fécamp and of course Caen.

In 1337, the dynastic rivalries between the Valois and the king of England precipitated the Hundred Years' War, which plunged the country into misery, aggravated by epidemics of plague. The Abbey of Saint-Vigor de Cerisy was fortified, and a garrison settled there. In 1418, Richard de Silly, knight and captain of the abbey, was obliged to cede the abbey to the King of England. However, after the victory of the constable de Richemont over the English at the Battle of Formigny in 1450, Normandy returned definitively to the kingdom of France.

Modern history

In 1660, a maréchaussée garrison was based in the village, and a prison established.

During the Second World War, Cerisy-la-Forêt sheltered refugees from Cherbourg.

On 12 June 1944 the 2nd Infantry Division was ordered to cross the river. When they reached the east bank, they encountered German resistance, which foreshadowed the end of the rapid advance begun on 7 June 1944. It was a small easily crossed river, but its crossing was difficult. A first attempt was stopped by machine-gun and mortar fire from the west bank. On 13 June 1944 the men of Company C of the 38th Infantry Regiment were ordered to cross the river at this point. The first attempt in the morning failed and it was only in the afternoon after the second offensive that they succeeded in reaching the other bank.

The fighting resulted in numerous casualties, ten men of Company C were killed and 23 others wounded. In total, the losses of the 2nd Infantry Division during the two days of combat amounted to 540 killed, wounded or disappeared.

During the second attack of Company C on 13 June 1944, the men were stopped by machine gun fire. German mortars began to adjust their fire on the American position. Advancing under mortars of their own, the men of C Company were successful in clearing out the area.

Gallery

Population

See also
Communes of the Manche department

References

Cerisylaforet